Jacques Rensburg may refer to:

 Jacques Rensburg (musician), Dutch / German musician
 Jacques Rensburg (field hockey), Belgian athlete, his grandson
 Jacques Janse van Rensburg, South African cyclist
 JC Janse van Rensburg, South African rugby player